River Tales is a 2020 Luxembourgian documentary film directed by Julie Schroell. It was selected as the Luxembourgian entry for the Best International Feature Film at the 93rd Academy Awards, but it was not nominated.

Synopsis
Along the San Juan River in Nicaragua, a teacher and his students put on a play that explores local identity and the river's colonial and environmental history.

See also
 List of submissions to the 93rd Academy Awards for Best International Feature Film
 List of Luxembourgish submissions for the Academy Award for Best International Feature Film

References

External links
 

2020 films
2020 documentary films
Luxembourgian documentary films
2020s Spanish-language films